Angélica María Vale Hartman (born November 11, 1975), known professionally as Angélica Vale, is a Mexican-American actress, singer, impersonator, comedian, and radio personality, known also as the daughter of Angélica María, "La Novia de Mexico" (Mexico's Sweetheart), and as the daughter of comedian Raúl Vale. She has been working as an actress for almost 30 years, but achieved fame in 2006 when she became the protagonist of La Fea Más Bella (The Prettiest Ugly Girl), a Mexican telenovela, with her real-life mother. She starred in the webnovela No me hallo as Luchita Guerra a young woman with a big dream of becoming a singer. Early in 2012, Vale was a team captain on the Mexican TV Show Parodiando, of Televisa network. Vale became a U.S. citizen in 2016, while retaining her Mexican citizenship.

Acting career
Vale was born in Mexico City, Mexico. As a child, in the movie El Gran Triunfo in 1981, Vale portrayed the daughter of Mexican superstar Rigo Tovar. From 1982 to 1986 her family was banned from Televisa due to the launch of the independent production "LUPITA" on the rival TV Azteca network in which she played the title role. All the family members were blacklisted until 1986, year in which Ernesto Alonso intervened on their behalf. He was instrumental in getting the ban lifted, allowing the family to return to work on Televisa's productions.

In 1998, she portrayed Julieta in Soñadoras and in 2001, she portrayed Wendy Nayeli Pérez in Amigas y rivales, both major roles which won acclaim for the actress. However, the soap opera La Fea Más Bella was her first starring role in any Mexican telenovela, though she had appeared in a number of Spanish language programs. As a comedian, Vale was one of the main celebrity impersonators in the comedy show La Parodia, from 2000 to 2005, but she chose to leave the show because she wanted to take some weeks off. From 2005 to 2006, she performed in El Privilegio de Mandar (The Privilege to Command), which was a parody of an earlier soap opera starring Adela Noriega and was titled El Privilegio de Amar (The Privilege to Love).

Because telenovelas are wildly popular throughout the Hispanic world, they are very profitable, even when they do not rate so well, so when , La Fea Más Bella became the number one Univision TV program according to 2006 Nielsen ratings, Vale was looked upon by many producers as a "sure thing," and it was speculated that this success would open the door for greater things to come.

Vale was one of eight people featured on the cover of People en Español's "Los 50 Más Bellos" 2007 yearly issue and was featured alone on the July 2007 cover of the magazine, reportedly more because of her recent popularity than because of her overall lengthy career (as many people in the business had stated that she was finally getting the international attention that she had come to deserve after laboring her talents so long and having very little ethical and commercial success).

In April 2007, People en Español announced that Vale would make a special guest appearance on Ugly Betty, in which she'd reprise her Lety role in the episode "A Tree Grows in Guadalajara," but instead she played a Lety look-alike named Angélica, who was a dental assistant, in the season finale.  Although her mother officially left Televisa after both actresses appeared on Mujeres Asesinas in 2009, Vale is still with Televisa, having most recently appeared on Parodiando.

Radio career
On October 15, 2019, Vale began hosting middays at Latin pop/reggaetón "Cali 93.9" KLLI in Los Angeles.  On January 28, 2020, she moved to mornings and added a side-kick Jose Quintero, who from 2017 to 2020 served as jr. producer of the morning show at KLVE in Los Angeles.

Singing career
Like her mother, Vale is also a singer and has performed on the soundtrack for La fea más bella. She did several notable impersonations of another singer, Verónica Castro on La Parodia doing parodies of Castro's show, Mala noche... no!. Vale is also listed in that program's credits as a singer of its theme song. She has also done many impressions of singers Shakira, Thalía, and Laura León among others while she worked on Soñadoras and Amigas y rivales; she also used some of these once more in La Parodia.

In 2007, after the finale of La Fea Más Bella, she sang one of the theme songs for the hit soap opera during an appearance on El Show de Cristina. During 2008, she made the music album Navidad con Amigos with Ricardo Montaner. Angélica Vale has been heavily pursued by paparazzi since the early 1990s, with a special focus on her love life. In the early stages of her life, she was rumored and confirmed as the girlfriend of actor Alejandro Ibarra, with whom it was also rumored that she was engaged to and would soon marry.

However this was not the case, and they split around the time that she was cast for the role of Margarita in Bendita Mentira. This attention did not surprise Vale, who as a young girl had seen the toll that paparazzi's attentions had taken on her mother and father's marriage when, according to tabloids, her father had led a double life with a woman in Texas.

In 2005, after the death of her father, this attention bothered her because she was constantly pestered by questions about her late father's will and testament and concerns about what the will said her father's young 'spouse' would receive after his death. She was overwhelmed to the point that she called for a meeting with all major television stations in Mexico and had them ask all the questions they wanted to ask, saying that if they did not ask then, they would never get answers because she planned on closing that chapter in her life because it was very painful to talk about something so private.

Later on, Vale was also linked to singer Jose Luis Figueroa, son of singer Joan Sebastian, during a time when he was still involved with Ninel Conde, (considered the hottest woman in the world by the Latin American press), but Angélica Vale denied these reports. Soon after, Ninel and Jose Luis broke up, and he stated it was because Ninel was too "thin" for his liking. Vale was also targeted much by claims that she liked to get involved with married men, and a story was published in 2006 about her having caused the separation of a family, because her then-current boyfriend had filed for divorce and his children had to live with seeing their father with another woman in public.

She also denied these allegations by claiming that the divorce had been filed one year prior to their relationship, and that his marriage was childless. Other rumors that have followed concerning her love life have been curiously sparked by a family friend, Cristina Saralegui, host of El Show de Cristina, who, when interviewing the cast of La Fea Más Bella, stated that she thought that 'Don Fernando' (Jaime Camil) and 'Doña Lety' (Angélica Vale) had really fallen in love, but she was cut off by Angélica María, also present, who changed the subject.

Angélica María also sparked rumors about her daughter because, she had made a habit of saying that she was waiting impatiently for her only child to make her a grandmother. Despite the constant intrusion into her life by paparazzi, Angélica Vale has managed to keep much of her life private, causing paparazzi to fabricate stories about her. She also had breast reduction around the time she finished La Fea Más Bella.

Personal life

Family

Vale's father was Venezuelan while her mother is white and Mexican who was born in Louisiana; she has a Jewish grandfather. Vale speaks English and Spanish fluently, and holds her own in French.

She and her mother, Angélica María, are among the very few daughter – mother entertainers to be inducted into the Paseo de las Luminarias at the Plaza de las Estrellas.  Vale was inducted for her work in television and regarding her contribution to the recording industry.

Vale and her parents are featured in the 2007 book Televisa Presenta, which was published during the culmination of the Network's golden anniversary.

Citizenship
In 2016, Vale became a naturalized U.S. citizen.

Filmography

Films

Television

Discography
1989: Angélica Vale
1990: Nuestro Show No Puede Parar
1992: Atrapada En Los 60's
2002: Amigas y Rivales Soundtrack
2006: La Fea Más Bella Soundtrack
2008: Navidad con Amigos
2015: "Dinastia: Angelica Vale y Angelica Maria"

Awards and nominations

References

External links
 
 Webnovela No Me Hallo – Angelica Vale

1975 births
Living people
20th-century American actresses
20th-century Mexican actresses
21st-century American actresses
21st-century Mexican actresses
American child actresses
American television actresses
American film actresses
American people of German descent
American people of Venezuelan descent
American stage actresses
American voice actresses
American women comedians
American radio personalities
American television hosts
Actresses from Mexico City
Mexican child actresses
Mexican television actresses
Mexican film actresses
Mexican parodists
Mexican people of American descent
Mexican people of German descent
Mexican people of Venezuelan descent
Mexican stage actresses
Mexican voice actresses
Mexican women comedians
Mexican women singers
Mexican radio presenters
Mexican women radio presenters
Mexican television presenters
Singers from Mexico City
People from Mexico City
Citizens of the United States through descent
20th-century American comedians
21st-century American comedians
21st-century American singers
21st-century Mexican singers
21st-century American women singers
American women television presenters
Mexican women television presenters
Mexican emigrants to the United States
Women in Latin music